Joshua Eduardo (born 8 March 1999), known professionally as Blanco, is a British rapper and singer. Beginning his career in 2015, he released his debut EP, English Dubbed, in 2019, and debut mixtape, City of God, in 2021. He is part of the UK drill group Harlem Spartans.

Career
Blanco began to write lyrics at the age of 15, taking inspiration from artists such as Skepta and 50 Cent. He would later join the Harlem Spartans collective through a youth centre in Kennington. In 2016, he released "Jason Bourne", which, according to New Wave Mag, certified his place as a well-respected drill artist.

In 2019, Blanco released his debut EP, English Dubbed.

On 24 August 2021, Blanco released his debut mixtape, named City of God after the 2002 film. The mixtape was named within Complexs best albums of 2021, with an article in Clash noting that the album saw him move away from a drill sound.

Personal life
Blanco is a supporter of football club Manchester City FC. He is of Angolan heritage.

Legal issues
Blanco was jailed following an incident in the early hours of 15 February 2017, when a taxi containing Blanco and fellow Harlem member Mucktar Khan, better known as MizOrMac, was pulled over by armed police. The police searched the pair and found a loaded gun on Blanco and a samurai sword he had attempted to conceal in his trousers; additionally, MizOrMac was wearing ballistic body armour and had a balaclava. On 9 February 2018, Blanco was convicted of possession of a firearm and possession of an offensive weapon in a public place and sentenced to three and a half years in prison. His co-defendant MizOrMac was sentenced to six years.

Discography

Mixtapes

EPs

Charted singles

References

21st-century British rappers
Black British male rappers
English male rappers
British hip hop musicians
Rappers from London
UK drill musicians
Gangsta rappers
People from Kennington
Living people
1999 births